John Spiegel Michels (born March 19, 1973 in La Jolla, California) is a former American football offensive tackle in the National Football League.

High school career
Michels attended La Jolla High School, where he was a three time letterman in football, basketball, and track. In football, he was a two-way starter and was named First-team All-American and Western League Defensive MVP as a defensive tackle, and First-team All-San Diego County as an offensive tackle. In track and field, he was the 1991 Western League Champion in the discus.

Michels was named as one of San Diego's 100 all-time greatest prep football players by the San Diego Union-Tribune.

College career
Michels played college football at the University of Southern California and was a First-team All-Pac-10 and a Second-team All-American offensive tackle, after being converted from a defensive end. He helped to lead the Trojans to a victory over Northwestern University in the 1996 Rose Bowl. After his senior year at USC, Michels was selected as a starter in the 1996 Senior Bowl All-Star game.

Professional career
Michels was drafted in the first round, 27th pick overall, of the 1996 NFL Draft by the Green Bay Packers. When then-starter and fellow Trojan Ken Ruettgers went down with a knee injury, Michels took over the left tackle duties. He started 9 games in his rookie season, helping the Packers win Super Bowl XXXI. He was named the Green Bay Packers 1996 Co-Rookie of the Year (along with Tyrone Williams) and earned NFL All-Rookie honors.

In 1997, he returned as the starting left tackle, starting the first five games of the season before injuring his right knee against the Detroit Lions. He was sidelined for the rest of the season and replaced by that year's first round pick Ross Verba. After having his best training camp as a professional in 1998, he again injured his right knee and spent the year on injured reserve. Unable to recover from his knee injury, he struggled in training camp in 1999 and was traded to the Philadelphia Eagles for defensive end Jon Harris. Michels only lasted a couple of weeks in Philadelphia before his knee injury ultimately ended his career.

Personal
Born John Spiegel Michels, Jr., Michels is the great-great-grandson of Joseph Spiegel, the founder of Spiegel Catalog, which was one of the most important firms in the mail-order industry, and arguably the first.

From 2000-2002 he served as the Youth Director at Canyon Hills Church in Mission Viejo, California.

In 2008 Michels received his medical degree from the Keck School of Medicine at the University of Southern California. He completed a residency in Diagnostic Radiology at Baylor College of Medicine in Houston, Texas, and a fellowship in Interventional Pain Medicine at the University of California, Irvine. He is a diplomate of the American Board of Radiology and the American Board of Pain Medicine. He currently practices at Interventional Spine & Pain in Dallas, Texas.

References

1973 births
Living people
American football offensive tackles
American people of German-Jewish descent
Players of American football from San Diego
USC Trojans football players
Keck School of Medicine of USC alumni
Baylor College of Medicine alumni
Green Bay Packers players
Philadelphia Eagles players
Spiegel family